Mirpur may refer to several places:

In Bangladesh 
 Mirpur Model Thana, a locality in Dhaka
 Mirpur DOHS, a neighbourhood of Dhaka
 Mirpur College, a private college
 Mirpur Stadium or Sher-e-Bangla National Cricket Stadium
 Mirpur Upazila, in Kushtia District

In India 
 Mirpur Turk, a town in Delhi
 Meerpur, a village in Madhya Pradesh
 Mirpur Jattan, a village in Punjab
 Mirpur, Sirohi, a village in Rajasthan

In Pakistan 
 Mirpur, Azad Kashmir, a city in Azad Kashmir
 Mirpur Division, an administrative division in Azad Kashmir 
 Mirpur District, a district in Azad Kashmir
 Mirpur Tehsil, a Tehsil in Azad Kashmir
 Mirpur Khas, a city in Sindh
 Mirpur Khas Division, an administrative division in Sindh
 Mirpur Khas District, a district in Sindh
 Mirpur, Khyber Pakhtunkhwa, a Union Council of Abbottabad district
 Mirpur Bathoro, a town in Sindh
 Mirpur Mathelo, a town in Sindh
 Mirpur Sakro, a town in Sindh